Iota Herculis (ι Herculis, ι Her) is a fourth-magnitude variable star system in the constellation Hercules, consisting of at least four stars all about  away. The brightest is a β Cephei variable, a pulsating star.

Visibility 

Iota Herculis is dim enough that in cities with a lot of light pollution it is unlikely to be visible with the naked eye. In rural areas it will usually be visible, and for much of the Northern Hemisphere the star is circumpolar and visible year around.

Pole star
As a visible star, the proximity of Iota Herculis to the precessional path the Earth's North Pole traces across the celestial sphere makes it a pole star, a title currently held by Polaris. In 10,000 BCE it was the pole star, and in the future it will be again. While Polaris is only 0.5° off the precessional path Iota Herculis is 4° off.

Properties 
Iota Herculis is a B-type subgiant star that is at the end of its hydrogen fusion stage. With a stellar classification B3IV, it is considerably larger than the Sun, having a mass that is 6.5 times solar and a radius 5.3 times. Though its apparent magnitude is only 3.80, it is 2,500 times more luminous than the Sun, yielding an absolute magnitude of −2.11, brighter in fact than the most of the hot B stars in the Pleiades open star cluster. The Hipparcos satellite mission estimated its distance at roughly 152 parsecs (pc) from Earth, or 496 light-years (ly) away; an updated parallax measurement from Floor van Leeuwen in 2007, however, puts the distance at 455 ly with a much tighter error factor of only 8 ly.

Star system
Iota Herculis is a multiple star system. Another companion can be found at approximately 30 AU from the main star, giving it an orbital period of about 60 years. Still another star has been identified with a common proper motion at an angular separation of 116 arcseconds and a visual magnitude of 12.1. This would place it approximately 18,000 AU away, giving it an orbit of about 1 million years.

Etymology

References

External links 
Jim Kaler's Stars, University of Illinois: IOTA HER (Iota Herculis)
An Atlas of the Universe: Multiple Star Orbits

Hercules (constellation)
Herculis, Iota
4
Tiān Bàng wu
B-type subgiants
Spectroscopic binaries
Slowly pulsating B stars
Herculis, 085
086414
160762
6588
Durchmusterung objects